Coshocton is a city in and the county seat of Coshocton County, Ohio, United States approximately 63 mi (102 km) ENE of Columbus. The population was 11,050 at the 2020 census. The Walhonding River and the Tuscarawas River meet in Coshocton to form the Muskingum River.

Coshocton contains Roscoe Village, a restored town of the canal era, located next to the former Ohio and Erie Canal. A heritage tourist attraction, it showcases the area's unique canal history. The city was developed on the site of a former Lenape village established in the late 1770s by bands who had migrated from the East under European oppression. Coshocton is the principal city of the Coshocton micropolitan area.

History
The Lenape sympathetic to the new United States stayed near Coshocton. White Eyes, then leader of the Lenape people, signed the Treaty of Fort Pitt of 1778, by which the Lenape hoped to secure their safety during the War, and he promised scouts and support to the rebel colonists.

In retaliation for frontier raids by hostile Lenape and British, Colonel Daniel Brodhead of the Continental Army ignored the treaty. After indiscriminately raiding and destroying the peaceful Moravian Christian Lenape settlement of Indaochaic also known as Lichtenau, he attacked and destroyed the Lenape at Coshocton in April 1781.

Coshocton was originally called Tuscarawas by American colonists, after the river, and under the latter name was laid out in 1802. The young town was renamed Coshocton when it was designated county seat by the legislature in 1811.

Geography
Coshocton is located at  (40.267786, −81.856628).

Climate

Demographics

2010 census
As of the census of 2010, there were 11,216 people, 4,872 households, and 2,927 families residing in the city. The racial makeup of the city was 95.7% White, 1.8% African American, 0.2% Native American, 0.4% Asian, 0.3% from other races, and 1.6% from two or more races. Hispanic or Latino of any race were 1.1% of the population.

There were 4,872 households, of which 27.1% had children under the age of 18 living with them, 42.5% were married couples living together, 13.1% had a female householder with no husband present, 4.5% had a male householder with no wife present, and 39.9% were non-families. 34.9% of all households were made up of individuals, and 17.9% had someone living alone who was 65 years of age or older. The average household size was 2.25 and the average family size was 2.85.

The median age in the city was 42.9 years. 21.7% of residents were under the age of 18; 7.7% were between the ages of 18 and 24; 23.2% were from 25 to 44; 27% were from 45 to 64; and 20.5% were 65 years of age or older. The gender makeup of the city was 46.8% male and 53.2% female.

2000 census
As of the census of 2000, there were 11,682 people, 5,048 households, and 3,160 families residing in the city. The population density was 1,562.1 people per square mile (603.0/km2). There were 5,471 housing units at an average density of 731.6 per square mile (282.4/km2). The racial makeup of the city was 96.05% White, 1.63% African American, 0.16% Native American, 0.79% Asian, 0.02% Pacific Islander, 0.33% from other races, and 1.03% from two or more races. Hispanic or Latino of any race were 0.59% of the population.

There were 5,048 households, out of which 28.0% had children under the age of 18 living with them, 48.5% were married couples living together, 10.8% had a female householder with no husband present, and 37.4% were non-families. 33.5% of all households were made up of individuals, and 17.7% had someone living alone who was 65 years of age or older. The average household size was 2.27 and the average family size was 2.87.

In the city the population was spread out, with 23.2% under the age of 18, 7.6% from 18 to 24, 25.5% from 25 to 44, 23.6% from 45 to 64, and 20.1% who were 65 years of age or older. The median age was 41 years. For every 100 females, there were 86.1 males. For every 100 females age 18 and over, there were 82.2 males.

The median income for a household in the city was $31,098, and the median income for a family was $42,088. Males had a median income of $31,163 versus $22,130 for females. The per capita income for the city was $17,436. About 6.8% of families and 8.3% of the population were below the poverty line, including 7.3% of those under age 18 and 6.4% of those age 65 or over.

Economy
Major employers include: Cleveland-Cliffs Steel Corporation – Coshocton Works, Annin Flagmakers, Buckeye Fabric Finishing Company, Coshocton City Schools, Coshocton Grain Company, Coshocton Regional Medical Center, Coshocton Trucking, Frontier Power, Interim Healthcare, ITM Marketing, Inc, Kraft Heinz, McWane Ductile, MFM Building Products Corporation, Ohio Central Railroad, Ohio Fabricators, SanCasT Inc, Signature HealthCARE, and Wiley Companies

Roscoe Village, a restored canal-era town that is located inside the city, adjacent Clary Gardens, the city's location at the confluence of the Tuscarawas, Walhonding, and Muskingum Rivers, and near area attractions such as several wineries, breweries and distilleries, Woodbury Wildlife Area, AEP recreation lands, two golf courses, Monticello III canal boat ride and restored canal, Lake Park Complex, Forest Hill Lake and numerous camping and hunting areas contribute to a growing tourism industry.

Coshocton has a rich history of entrepreneurship and innovation. It was the birthplace of the Specialty Advertising Industry, latex coated gloves, March of Dimes, Pope-Gosser China and many other industries, products and ideas.

Education

College
Central Ohio Technical College, Coshocton Campus

Library
The main branch of the Coshocton Public Library system is located on Main Street in downtown Coshocton.

References

External links
 City of Coshocton Government
 Convention & Visitor's Bureau

 
British-American culture in Ohio
cities in Coshocton County, Ohio
cities in Ohio
county seats in Ohio
Muskingum River